The Asejire Reservoir is in Oyo State in the south west of Nigeria on the Osun River, about 30 kilometers east of Ibadan. The reservoir was built in the late 1960s. Farming is totally banned in the catchment area, and trees have been planted on the banks, so erosion and silting are not issues. With plentiful water supply, the reservoir remains full throughout the year. 
The reservoir provides raw water to the Asejire and Osegere water treatment plants in Ibadan.
The water supply project was completed in 1972, and has a capacity of about 80 million liters per day, of which 80% is used for domestic purposes.

References

Reservoirs in Nigeria
Oyo State